Elizabeth Lodor Teter Lunn (June 14, 1904 – February 1, 1998) was an American biologist and college professor. She was head of the biology department at Lake Forest College from 1954 to 1964. The Elizabeth Teter Lunn Herbarium at Lake Forest is named in her memory.

Early life and education 
Elizabeth Lodor Teter was born in Chicago, the daughter of Lucius Teter and Clara Hahn Lodor Teter. Her father was a bank president. She graduated from Wellesley College in 1925. She pursued further studies at Northwestern University, where she earned a master's degree in 1932 and a PhD in 1939. Her dissertation was titled "The ecology of the forest floor, with particular reference to microarthropods".

Career 
Lunn taught biology at Lake Forest College from 1930 to 1935, and from 1946 to 1970; she was head of the biology department from 1954 to 1964. She helped to organize and advised the campus chapter of Beta Beta Beta, and gathered many specimens and photographs for the school's herbarium, from the Illinois Beach State Park and elsewhere in the state. She wrote Plants of Illinois Dunesland (1982) 

From 1935 to 1946 she did not teach at Lake Forest College. She worked in the oil industry as a laboratory chemist, and as a clerk for the United States Army Corps of Engineers. She was president of the Illinois Dunesland Preservation Society in 1968. She served on the board of directors of the Lake County Tuberculosis Association. She was a trustee of the Illinois chapter of the Nature Conservancy.

Personal life 
Elizabeth Teter married Richard Sanborn Lunn. Richard Lunn died in 1972. Elizabeth Teter Lunn died in 1998, in Avon, New York, aged 93 years. Her papers, including plant notebooks, in the Lake Forest College Archives and Special Collections. The Elizabeth Teter Lunn Herbarium at Lake Forest is named in her memory.

References

External links 
Jennifer E. Woodruff, "Voices of Change: Women's Experiences at Lake Forest College, 1955 – 1975" (Senior thesis, Lake Forest College 2000).

1904 births
1998 deaths
American biologists
Wellesley College alumni
Lake Forest College faculty
Northwestern University alumni
American women scientists
American ecologists